Martin Bavidge (born 30 April 1980 in Aberdeen) is a Scottish retired professional footballer. He played as a forward.

Bavidge started his career with Forres Mechanics in the Highland Football League before going on to play for Inverness Caledonian Thistle, Forfar Athletic, Peterhead and Inverurie Loco Works.

Bavidge has worked in the oil industry since 2003. He missed a Scottish Cup replay against Raith Rovers in December 2009, due to having to travel to Texas to satisfy work commitments. Raith won the game 4–1.

On Tuesday 18 September 2012, Peterhead played at home to Aberdeen in a testimonial match for Bavidge to celebrate ten years of good service to the Balmoor side. The Dons won the game 4–0.

References

External links

Living people
1980 births
Footballers from Aberdeen
Scottish footballers
Inverness Caledonian Thistle F.C. players
Forfar Athletic F.C. players
Peterhead F.C. players
Inverurie Loco Works F.C. players
Scottish Football League players
Association football forwards